

The Lucas L5 was a sport aircraft designed in France in the late 1970s and marketed for amateur construction. It was a conventional, low-wing cantilever monoplane with side-by-side seating for two in a fully enclosed cabin. Construction was of metal throughout, and the builder was given the option of fixed, tricycle undercarriage, or tailwheel undercarriage in which the main units were manually retractable.

Specifications

Notes

References

External links
 Photo gallery on designer's website
 Video of a Lucas L5 in flight, and brief talk with designer Emile Lucas (in French)

1970s French sport aircraft
Lucas aircraft
Homebuilt aircraft
Single-engined tractor aircraft
Low-wing aircraft
Aircraft first flown in 1976